The Jacksonville Zoo and Gardens, located in Jacksonville, Florida, sits at the mouth of the Trout River, near where it flows into the St. Johns River. The zoo has grown from its modest beginnings in Springfield to be considered one of the city's premier attractions, with more than one million visits annually.

The Jacksonville Zoo and Gardens' marquee attractions are the Range of the Jaguar, which won the 2005 AZA Exhibit of the year award and the Land of the Tiger, which opened in 2014 and features an innovative walk-through trail system for five tigers. The zoo's other exhibits include the Plains of East Africa, highlighting African savanna animals; the Australian Outback; African Forest, featuring two of the four genera of great apes, as well as several species of lemurs; and Wild Florida, which features animals native to the state.

The zoo is active in animal conservation, participating in more than 50 national and international conservation initiatives and more than 95 Species Survival Plans. In 2004, the zoo reached an agreement with the nation of Guyana to help promote conservation in that country, particularly the Iwokrama Forest. Additionally, since 1999 the zoo has been home to a large breeding colony of wild wood storks.  Though not endangered, this bird is a rare find on the North American continent, and has, in this case, taken up permanent residence in a tree overlooking the Plains of Africa.

History 
The Municipal Zoo opened in the Springfield neighborhood of Jacksonville, Florida on May 12, 1914. The first animal on exhibit was a red deer fawn.

On July 19, 1925, the zoo moved to a  site on the Trout River off Heckscher Drive in the city's Northside area.

Perhaps the most significant animal in the zoo's history was a jaguar named Zorro. Zorro was a male, wild-born black (melanistic) jaguar that arrived at the zoo in August 1967. At that time, black jaguars were very rare in captivity. During Zorro's 19 years at the zoo (he died in September, 1986), he fathered numerous cubs that were sent to other zoos across North America. In the spring of 2003, the Jax Zoo investigated and could not find a current North American captive-born black jaguar that was not a descendant of Zorro.

By the end of the 1960s, the zoo was reputed to have the largest collection of exotic animals in the Southeast, but it had fallen on hard times and a great deal of money was needed to save the zoo. Community leaders, under the direction of Mayor Hans Tanzler, appointed a seven-member committee to search for an alternative to closing the zoo.

A major redevelopment of the zoo began in 1992. Through a combination of public funds and private donations, over $20 million was raised. Projects completed include a new front entry gate and parking lot, the Main Camp entrance, Birds of the Rift Valley Aviary, Great Apes, an expanded train ride, an elephant and breeding complex, RiverBranch Foundation Animal Medical Center, the PepsiCo Foundation Education Campus, and redevelopment of the  Plains of East Africa. Exhibits also include Stingray Bay, Tuxedo Coast, and the Asian bamboo garden and Komodo dragon exhibit.

In December 2003, the zoo's name was officially changed from the Jacksonville Zoological Gardens to the Jacksonville Zoo and Gardens.  Over the next five years, several new exhibits and services, including the famed Range of the Jaguar, the Savanna Blooms botanical garden, and the Children's Play Park successfully opened to the public. In addition, the zoo has endeavored to become recognized as a botanical garden.

The zoo houses over 2,400 rare and exotic animals and over 1,500 unique plant species and participates in many preservation and breeding programs to ensure the survival of endangered and threatened species as well as local fauna and flora.

Management and finance 
The Jacksonville Zoological Society began managing the zoo on June 21, 1971.  Originally consisting of only the seven members appointed by Mayor Tanzler, the society now consists of 85 of the city's most influential leaders. There are currently thirty Board of Trustees members, with sixteen honorary members. The board conducts business regarding the zoo in the name of the society.

The City of Jacksonville contracts with the society to manage all phases of the operation of the zoo. All property, including land, animals and equipment, belong to the city; in turn, the city contributes an annual subsidy to offset some of the zoo's operating expenses. All other zoo expenses are paid through revenues earned from admissions, concession sales, memberships, the Animal Care Club program, the Annual Fund, sponsorships, grants, and fundraising events.

Current exhibits

African exhibits 
The northern part of the zoo is dominated by a series of African exhibits.

River Valley Aviary

The aviary opened in April 1996 and houses a mixture of African, South American, and Asia wildlife. The aviary features ibises, waterfowl, storks and other African birds. In late 2008, the zoo began to add Asian animals to the aviary, including a muntjac and a Victoria crowned pigeon. A breeding pair of saddle-billed storks live in the enclosure. The zoo was just the sixth in the US to successfully breed this species.

To the side of the main aviary is the Ruzizi Streambank. A Verreaux's eagle-owl along with other smaller African birds are found there.

Birds
Abdim's stork
African spoonbill
Blue-bellied roller
Cape teal
Hadada ibis
Hamerkop
Javan pond heron
Marbled duck
Northern bald ibis
Ruddy duck
Spotted dikkop
Tawny frogmouth
Verreaux's eagle-owl
Violet turaco
White-faced whistling duck
Yellow-billed duck
Yellow-billed stork

Plains of East Africa

The first major exhibit that guests encounter. The exhibit is primarily viewed from an elevated walkway giving guests a bird's eye view of the animals. The exhibit was renovated and expanded in 1996.

Flamingos and warthogs are among the first animals guests encounter. The zoo was the first in North America to successfully breed southern ground hornbills.

Bongos and duikers are found in a center pen that is spacious and tree-shaded. This exhibit has become a home for a large breeding colony for the highly endangered wood stork, native to Florida.

It lies across a water break from the larger exhibit containing white rhinoceroses, kudu, ostrich and crowned cranes inhabit the areas at the end of the boardwalk. This  exhibit allows plenty of room for the animals to roam. The zoo has been a successful breeder of southern white rhinos, with over a dozen successful births.

Mammals
Common warthog
Cheetah
Eastern bongo
Greater kudu
Grévy's zebra
Southern white rhinoceros
Yellow-backed duiker
 
Birds
Blue crane 
Greater flamingo
Grey crowned crane
North African ostrich
Wattled crane

Reptiles
Aldabra giant tortoise

Elephant Plaza
This offers an intimate view of the zoo's three African elephants in their 275,000-gallon pool. The zoo is one of the few to house male elephants. The bull elephant, Ali, was donated by Michael Jackson in 1997. The other two, Thandi and Sheena, are females. The area features a reptile house with African reptiles.

Further down the boardwalk is Mahali Pa Simba ("Place of the Lion" in Swahili), the  home of the zoo's male lions, Catali and Mshoni, and females, Tamu and Laini. The exhibit was the first to be opened and has evolved over the years. The largest change was the addition of a third viewing area across a moat on the exhibit's north side. The zoo welcomed the birth of three cubs in 2014 to mother Tamu and father Catali.

Amur leopards were housed along the southern end of the boardwalk. The exhibit is highlighted by the gigantic artificial tree in the center of the exhibit that the leopards love to sleep and play on. The zoo successfully bred this rare species in 2010. The zoo's last leopard, Nicolai passed away in November 2020 at the age of 19. Their habitat is now home to yellow-billed storks, African spoonbills, northern bald ibises and southern screamers.

Giraffe Overlook
The covered boardwalk gives guests a view across a replica of the African Savanna, and guests can also get eye-to-eye with the zoo's herd of seven giraffes. Drinks and giraffe food are sold at the overlook. Reticulated giraffes are found in this  exhibit, adjacent to the new Savanna Blooms botanical garden. The giraffe herd currently comprises seven individuals. Duke is the only adult male, and the females are Spock, Faraja, Naomi, and Luna. There are also two newborns, a female named Fiji and a male that has not yet been named.

Mammals
African bush elephant
Lion
Reticulated giraffe
Siamang
Straw-colored fruit bat

Birds
Blue-bellied roller
Golden-breasted starling
Lappet-faced vulture
Southern screamer
White-crowned robin-chat
White-bellied bustard
Yellow-billed stork

Reptiles
Cape cobra
Central African rock python
Gaboon viper
Henkel's leaf-tailed gecko
Pancake tortoise
Puff adder
Meller's chameleon
Red spitting cobra
Shield-tailed agama
Sudan plated lizard
Turquoise dwarf gecko
Warren's girdled lizard
Western green mamba

African Forest (Great Apes of the World) 

African Forest gives zoo visitors a look at the various primates that inhabit our planet. Although monkeys and strepsirrhine primates are also featured, as the previous name suggests the apes are the stars of the exhibit.  The exhibit opened in two phases in 1998 and 1999 at a cost of $20 million. Phase I included western lowland gorillas and bonobos, the first time the zoo had exhibited either species. The zoo's collection of bonobos is one of only nine in North America. The exhibit provided new homes for the zoo's siamangs and pygmy marmosets. Phase II included a second gorilla yard, along with new exhibits for the zoo's chimpanzees and mandrills, along with renovating the old monkey island area for a lemur exhibit.

Since the exhibit opened, it has gradually changed over the years. The pygmy marmosets were relocated to the zoo's Range of the Jaguars exhibit in 2004 and the chimpanzees were sent to another zoo in 2007.

In 2018, this exhibit became the African Forest.

Mammals
Black-and-white ruffed lemur
Blue-eyed black lemur
Bonobo
Coquerel's sifaka
Mandrill
Mantled guereza
Mongoose lemur
Ring-tailed lemur
Western lowland gorilla

Wild Florida 
Built on the site of the old Florida Wetlands exhibit, this highlights animals native to the state, as well as some that have been extirpated.

In 2007, the former American flamingo exhibit was renovated to accommodate the eagles, so that their exhibit could be used for a pair of whooping cranes the zoo acquired.  The reptile house in the exhibit shows off the variety of reptiles and amphibians native to the region. Eastern diamondback rattlesnakes, Florida cottonmouths, and indigo snakes are among the main attractions.

This area is also home to the Manatee Critical Care Center.  Here, manatees from the waterways of Northeast Florida and Southeast Georgia that are found to be suffering from injury, illness, or cold-stress, can be brought for treatment, recuperation, recovery, and eventual release.  It is one of only four such clinics in Florida.  Due to the nature of the facility, any manatees seen from the viewing area will only be present for the duration of their rehabilitation, and there may be times when no manatees are present.

Mammals
American black bear
Bobcat
Coyote
Florida panther
West Indian manatee
White-tailed deer

Birds
Bald eagle
Sandhill crane
Whooping crane
Wild turkey

Reptiles
Alligator snapping turtle
American alligator
Burmese python
Corn snake
Diamondback terrapin
Dusky pygmy rattlesnake
Eastern copperhead
Eastern coral snake
Eastern diamondback rattlesnake
Eastern glass lizard
Eastern indigo snake
Eastern mud turtle
Eastern rat snake
Florida box turtle
Florida cottonmouth
Gopher tortoise
Timber rattlesnake

Fish
Bluegill

Amphibians
American green tree frog
Cuban tree frog
Greater siren
Squirrel tree frog

Invertebrates

Range of the Jaguar 

This exhibit won the 2005 AZA exhibit of the year award. The exhibit is the largest in terms of number of animals. The exhibit features the largest jaguar exhibit in North America, with many pools of water for the animals to play in. In the water is a school of giant pacu. Currently, the zoo has six jaguars in its collection.  One of the rare scenes in the exhibit is to see a jaguar actually fish for food. The jaguars are Zenta, Zassi, Onca, and males Tuco, Saban and Khan, named for Jacksonville Jaguars owner Shad Khan, with whom he shares a birthday. Khan was sent to the Birmingham Zoo in March 2017.

The Lost Temple is constructed to look like an old Central American temple, and highlights Central and South American reptiles and amphibians.

The River's Edge features a pair of giant anteaters, a pair of capybaras, and various primates.

The Emerald Forest Aviary is the largest aviary on zoo grounds, housing over 100 Neotropical birds. As of November 2007, giant otters have replaced the smaller otters in the aviary. Just outside the aviary are American flamingos and various swan species native to South America.

Mammals
Black howler
Capybara
Common squirrel monkey
Common vampire bat
Cotton-top tamarin
Giant anteater
Giant otter
Jaguar
Seba's short-tailed bat

Birds
American flamingo
American oystercatcher
Black-bellied whistling duck
Blue-and-yellow macaw
Brown pelican
Double-crested cormorant
Double-striped thick-knee
Guira cuckoo
Hooded merganser
Inca tern
Orinoco goose
Plush-crested jay
Red-and-green macaw
Roseate spoonbill
Rosy-billed pochard
Ruddy duck
Scarlet ibis
Scarlet macaw
Spotted dikkop
Sunbittern

Reptiles
Amazon Basin emerald tree boa
Arrau turtle
Aruba island rattlesnake
Central American river turtle
Emerald tree boa
Eyelash viper
Garden tree boa
Green anaconda
Jamaican boa
Mata mata
Meso-American slider
Mexican alligator lizard
Northern caiman lizard
Rainbow boa
Red-footed tortoise
Rio Fuerte beaded lizard
Serrated casquehead iguana
South American bushmaster
Taylor's cantil
Utila spiny-tailed iguana
Yellow-bellied puffing snake

Amphibians
Blue poison dart frog
Green and black poison dart frog
Rio Cauca caecilian

Fish
Black pacu
Freshwater stingray
Sailfin pleco

Invertebrates

Australian Adventure 
Opened in March 2002, the Outback Steakhouse's Australian Adventure attraction was the first new major exhibit at the south end of the zoo in seven years. The attraction is no longer sponsored by Outback.

Included in this South Pacific attraction are the cassowary and lories and lorikeets. For a dollar, guests are given popsicle sticks covered with a type of powdered nectar, to feed the lorikeets with.

Koalas were part of the exhibit from its opening until December 2006. The koalas were then sent back to the San Diego Zoo as per the terms of their lease. The koala exhibit became an Amphibian Conservation Center on February 15, 2007.

Birds
Blue-bellied roller
Blue-crowned motmot
Coconut lorikeet
Emu
Laughing kookaburra
Racket-tailed roller
Rainbow lorikeet
Southern cassowary

Amphibians
African bullfrog
Anthony's poison arrow frog
Gulf Coast waterdog
Kaiser's newt
Magnificent tree frog
New Granada cross-banded tree frog
Panamanian golden frog
Puerto Rican crested toad
Striped newt

Children's Play Park 
Phase one of the Jacksonville Zoo's  Play Park opened in May 2006 across from the Range of the Jaguar. The park replaced the outdated Okovango Village, which had been demolished a year earlier. The exhibit includes a Splash Ground water park (open seasonally) for children, an outdoor jungle gym, and a hedge maze. Animals featured include squirrel monkeys with themed activities for kids by their exhibit. In the barnyard area, children can pet farm animals like pygmy goats. The Discovery Center features educational programs.

In April, 2010 the Play Park became home to "Tuxedo Coast", a new Magellanic penguin exhibit, replacing the river otters formerly exhibited here. Underwater viewing is available to watch the penguins splash and swim in their new exhibit.

Mammals
Common squirrel monkey
Nigerian Dwarf goat
West African Dwarf goat

Birds
Magellanic penguin

Stingray Bay 
Stingray Bay opened on March 1, 2008, and features several species of rays housed in a 17,000-gallon, 30-by- saltwater pool, guests are able to touch and feed both cownose ray, southern stingray, and Atlantic stingray. The exhibit replaced the Camel Rides in the same location near the Great Plains of East Africa. In 2011, the zoo took its operation over fully from an outside contractor, allowing the exhibit to stay open year-round. There is an additional fee to enter this exhibit.

Asian Bamboo Garden and Komodo dragon exhibit 

The beautiful Asian Bamboo Garden opened in March 2009. It features plantings and design elements drawn from throughout Asia, and is not intended to represent a specific country or culture. Entry is from Trout River Plaza through a traditional circular moon gate. A large lotus pond and koi pool incorporate rock and water features intended to evoke Chinese yin and yang principles. An Orchid Pavilion patterned after a Japanese tea house overlooks the pond. The garden also features a Moon Bridge, reflecting the shape of the moon in the water of the lotus pool, and a bamboo grove containing a bronze sculpture of a giant panda.

Beyond the Bamboo Garden is the Komodo dragon exhibit, designed to appear as if the dragons are wandering in the back yards of a rural Indonesian fishing village on the island of Komodo.

Land of the Tiger 

In 2014, the zoo opened the Land of the Tiger. It is a beautifully designed exhibit with naturalistic surroundings and built-in enrichment for the animals. As the guest enters the Land of the Tiger, two species of hornbills can be seen. Visayan warty pigs live in a large enclosure nearby. While small-clawed otters and babirusa share one exhibit with a heated pool.

The zoo currently have two kinds of tiger: two Malayan tigers, one male named Bashir who came from Zoo Knoxville, and one female named Cinta who came from Busch Gardens Tampa Bay; Along with two female Sumatran tigers, named Dorcas and Kinleigh Rose, with the latter being the former's daughter. Each of the tigers are given access to a state-of-the-art exhibit which features a walk-through tunnel system, that allows the large cats to choose where they would like to roam. While also granting the guests a unique opportunity to see the tigers from many different vantage points.

Mammals
Asian small-clawed otter
Malayan tiger
North Sulawesi babirusa
Sumatran tiger
Visayan warty pig

Birds
Rhinoceros hornbill
Wreathed hornbill

Reptiles
Komodo dragon

Fish
Koi

Animal conservation programs

Iwokrama Forest and Guyana 
With the opening of the Range of the Jaguar exhibit, the zoo also unveiled its project with the nation of Guyana and the Iwokrama Forest. Signs around the exhibit show what is being done to protect the animals shown in their native habitats. The partnership allows the zoo to receive animals that would be unable to released back to the wild, such as with the 2006 addition of two jaguars which were household pets sent to the zoo from Guyana.

Wood storks 
The antelope exhibit in the Plains of East Africa has become home to a large breeding colony of wood storks. The storks return every year because of the abundance of water and fish in the immediate area.  The colony has grown from just 7 nesting pairs that produced no chicks in 1999 to 82 pairs that produced 219 chicks in 2005. The zoo's colony has been deemed the most important established breeding colony of woodstorks in North Florida. At the end of the 2006 breeding season, several firsts occurred. It was the first year birds that were tagged as hatching at the zoo returned to breed, along with the first sighting of a bird tagged at another rookery. At the end of the 2006 season, it is estimated over 800 chicks have been successfully raised in the colony since 2000.

Species Survival Plan breeding programs

Botanical Gardens

Savanna Blooms 

This first themed pocket garden was completed in spring 2005. Nestled beneath the Giraffe Overlook, visitors will find acacia groves that flank two entrances into the one-half acre garden.  This unique garden, fashioned after a South African oasis, transitions from soft grasslands and fine textured acacia leaves at each entrance into a bold contemporary garden at its core.  Kopje outcrops erupt from the landscape, and a weep trickles down the face of the rocks.  The spring feeds a serene pool that showcases African water lilies and water edge plants.  Visitors rest beneath the curved trellis laden with fragrant flowering vines and view the garden's splendor from an internal vantage point.

Gardens of Trout River Plaza
In 2005–2007, the area encompassing the old Okovango Landing, as well as the children's play area was renovated. In September 2007, the $1.9 million Trout River Plaza botanical garden opened. The area - which also includes a grassy area named "The Lawn" which will be used for special events - encompasses . The heart of the new addition is the 1/4 acre garden space, partially walled with a fountain with an anhinga sculpture, flower beds and a lot of hardscape. There are columns topped with flowering plants, benches for seating, and a large patio area surrounding the fountain. Seven live oaks and other native trees - red maples, magnolias, and forest pansies - have been planted in the area around the garden to provide shade.

Aisan Bamboo Garden
This garden is used as an introduction to their Asian animal exhibit. They used various types of plants from across many Asian countries to help resonate with their general culture. Some of the significant features of this garden include the Moon Gate, Lotus Pool, Weeping Tree Bridge, and the Orchid Pavilion.

Services

Restaurants 
The Main Camp Café snack bar offers quick refreshments near the park's entrance, as well as a Starbucks Café inside. As part of the Range of the Jaguar exhibit, the Palm Plaza Café offers a southwestern menu. They have a variety of vegetarian and gluten-free options, which can be eaten in their indoor and outdoor seating. The Sweet Shop is also located in Range of the Jaguar. At the back of the zoo, near the Gardens of Trout River Plaza exhibit and the former Trout River pier entrance, is the Trout River Grill. Next to Trout River Grill is where the Kona Ice Truck can be seen. Here people can cool off with some shaved ice in the hot Florida weather. Play Park Cafe is near the Children's Play Park.

Picnic grounds are located at the south end of the zoo's parking lot, near the Education Campus. No open fire or grills are allowed.

Education

Family Early Childhood Education 
Semester long programs for children ages 1 to 5. Classes take place PepsiCo Foundation Education Campus located at the south end of the Zoo's main parking lot. You do not need to enter the Zoo in order to enter the education campus. Natures Newbies are 45 minute long programs for children ages 1 to 3. Zoo Tots are 60 minutes lone and open to children ages 3 to 5.

Group Early Childhood Education 
This program is offered both onsite and as an outreach for children ages Pre-K through Kindergarten.

Classroom Programs  
Formal education programs at the PepsiCo Foundation Education Campus may be scheduled Monday through Friday, September through May at 9:30 a.m., 10:30 a.m., 11:30 a.m. or 12:30 p.m. Programs are available for Pre-K through 12th grade and have been developed in conjunction with the Next Generation Sunshine State and the Common Core Standards. Presentations focus on a grade-level appropriate subjects and may include up-close and hands-on animal encounters.

Field Trips 
March, April & May are the busiest months for school visits. Nearly 50,000 or 50% of the zoo's annual field trip attendance occurs during these spring months. JZG is a field trip destination for nearly 100,000 school students, teachers and chaperones every year from as far away as Columbia, SC & Savannah, GA, Orlando & Tallahassee, FL.

Homeschool Programs  
Zoocademy is a unique experience for Homeschool students ages 5–18, covering a range of topics in Biology, Zoology, Environmental Science and Conservation. This course runs from September 2016- March 2017.

Students ages 5–12 will meet at the Education Campus at the Jacksonville Zoo and Gardens once a month. Students ages 13–18 will attend class once every other month at the Education Campus at the Jacksonville Zoo and Gardens. Enrollment is limited to home-schooled children ages 5–18. Children will be enrolled into the appropriate age class based on their age as of September 1, 2016. In accordance with Florida state law, children must be 5 years old on or before September 1 to enroll.

Due to COVID-19, there have been new guidelines in place to ensure the students' safety. First, masks are required for all students and staff while indoors. They have also eliminated snack breaks to help prevent covid transmission. Class sizes are only up to 15 students, and parents must sign a liability waiver before the students are admitted.

After Dark Adventures 
The Education Department's After Dark Adventures are unique events that take participants behind the scenes to meet the exotic animal collection up-close. After Dark Adventures take place outside of regular zoo hours. These include special events and safari sleepovers.

Zoo Camps 
Zoo Camps are held during school vacations. Camp programs include Zoo tours, activities and games, crafts, and hands-on encounters with animals every day. Registration opens seasonally.

In addition to school vacations, some zoo camps are held around holidays and themed around those events.

Zoo to You Outreach  
This outreach program is designed to serve various groups and venues from classrooms to large auditoriums and special events. The classroom program is available for up to 30 attendees, the auditorium program serves groups of 31 to 250, and events and festivals option is available for larger functions. Age appropriate topics for Classroom and Auditorium programs are available.

Teacher and Educator Workshops 
Teach workshops are available for classroom teacher, home schooling parent, museum or park service educator. The Zoo's Education Department Teacher & Educator Workshops are designed to help educators engage their students in environmental education. Topics vary and many can be counted towards continuing education requirements.

Scout Programs  
The Education Department offers many opportunities for scouts to learn about the animal world. Programs range from 45-minute classroom programs to sleepovers at the Zoo in various exhibit areas. Programs may include live animals, biofacts, activities, games, tours, or crafts. The zoo also offers a variety of programs that help scouts work towards their badge requirements.

Graduate Education 
The Jacksonville Zoo and Gardens is a part of Miami University’s graduate-level Advanced Inquiry Program (AIP). The program offers a Master of Arts in Biology or Master of Arts in Teaching through online coursework and face-to-face experiential learning experiences at the zoo. AIP Master's students earn 35 credit hours by experiential learning at the Jacksonville Zoo and Gardens as well as core curriculum courses that occur on the web. Applications for the Advanced Inquiry Program open in September for the following year, with classes starting in May. Part of the preliminary process includes filling out a short interest form, which helps them gauge general interest in the program. The program is eligible for anyone who has a bachelor's degree, regardless of their major, and applicants must at least have a 2.75 GPA.

Future plans

Gardens 
More themed pocket and primary gardens are planned to open in the future, in coordination with new animal exhibits as they are constructed. The second primary garden is the Asian Bamboo Garden, which opened in 2009. The exhibit features a koi pond and waterfall, along with a bamboo island. A Komodo dragon exhibit is included. The garden will serve as the entrance for a new Asian exhibit currently in design.

The area along the Trout River waterfront at the zoo is set to become formal botanical gardens in the future, as funding is obtained.

Gallery

References

External links

 Map of the zoo

Zoos in Florida
Tourist attractions in Jacksonville, Florida
Buildings and structures in Jacksonville, Florida
Parks in Jacksonville, Florida
Education in Jacksonville, Florida
Northside, Jacksonville
1914 establishments in Florida